Słowenkowo  is a village in the administrative district of Gmina Sławoborze, within Świdwin County, West Pomeranian Voivodeship, in north-western Poland. \

The village has a population of 140.

References

Villages in Świdwin County